Bahar is an obsolete unit of measurement.

 In Iran it was a unit of length approximately equal to 3.25 cm (1.28 in) 
 In Oman, it was a unit of mass equal to approximately 808 g (1.781 lb)

References

.

Obsolete units of measurement
Units of length
Units of mass